In 1975 several notable events happened in spaceflight such as the launch and arrival at Venus of Venera 9 and 10, the launch to Mars of the Viking orbiter/landers missions, the joint Apollo–Soyuz Test Project, and the launch of satellite Aryabhatta.

The Venera 9 mission was launched 8 June 1975 and on 20 October 1975 became the first spacecraft to orbit Venus; two days later its lander returned the first images from the surface of any planet (other than Earth).
Venera 10 was launched on 14 June 1975; it entered orbit of Venus on 23 October 1975 and its lander arrived on the surface of Venus on 25 October 1975. Both Venera 9 and Venera 10 returned various scientific observations of Venus and black-and-white television pictures from the planet's surface. 
Viking 1 was launched on 20 August 1975 and Viking 2 was launched 9 September 1975. This orbiter/lander mission was to photograph the surface of Mars in 1976.
The Apollo-Soyuz saw an end to the space race with the US and USSR. The mission was launched between 15 July 1975 and 17 July 1975.
On 19 April India launched its first satellite, Aryabhatta  with success.

Launches

|colspan=8|

January
|-

|colspan=8|

February
|-
|colspan=8|

March
|-

|colspan=8|

April
|-

|colspan=8|

May
|-

|colspan=8|

June
|-

|colspan=8|

July
|-

|colspan=8|

August
|-

|colspan=8|

September
|-

|colspan=8|

October
|-

|colspan=8|

November
|-

|colspan=8|

December
|-

Deep space rendezvous

EVAs

References

Footnotes

 
Spaceflight by year